Mantelzorg means cloak care in Dutch. It describes the system of informal social care in the Netherlands.

Informal care is the care for chronically ill, disabled and needy by relatives, friends, acquaintances and neighbours. Typically, there is a pre-existing personal relationship between the caregiver and his or her neighbour. This care is normally unpaid.

In the Netherlands, there are 3.6 million people who care for another. Around 1.1 million caregivers provide more than 8 hours per week and for more than three months for another. 450 000 carers feel burdened or overburdened. Most carers find it natural to care for their neighbour, but run into numerous problems. For example, it is difficult to combine caring with paid employment, it is difficult to transfer temporarily to caring and many carers incur extra cost.

Every year in the Netherlands Dag van de Mantelzorg, Carers Day is celebrated. Across the country there are organized activities for carers. This takes place in the week of the Chronically Ill in November.

In Flanders there are a 6 associations that represent the interests of carers, (Steunpunt Mantelzorg, Samana, Liever Thuis LM, Ons Zorgnetwerk, S-Plus Mantelzorg, Okra-Zorgrecht). There is also the 'Vlaams Expertisepunt Mantelzorg'. They collect information, publications, tools and tips about family care that is published on their website

http://www.mantelzorgers.be

Mantelzorg House
A care home is a  For the construction or installation of a home for a caregiver for someone in the grounds of a house who needs care or vice versa no environmental permit is required. However, building regulations do apply. If the care stops the building does not need to be removed, but it needs to be changed so that it is no longer a home. For example, it may be necessary to remove the kitchen and bathroom, downgrading it to the status of a shed.

Complement informal care and eventual reduction of the inheritance tax
In the Netherlands Government under the Social Support Act 2015, specified in Article 6a and beyond the control social support, to a person who provides care provide care complement. The condition is that the CIZ or youth care agency is registered for at least 371 days for outpatient care under the Exceptional Medical Expenses Act.

It holds both a very low benefit in (2012: €200) as a token of appreciation; a groomed can make providing this once a year to one carer; a caregiver that provides for more people can get the benefit per annum once. If the caregiver and the cared for relatives in the straight line and kept his wealth then, however, in the event that took care of the next calendar year dies under conditions far greater financial interest. In the case that the caregiver a joint household has the cared then the volunteer complement one of the conditions as partners for the purposes of inheritance tax to apply. This may result in more than €100,000 will be avoided in inheritance tax. The tax website suggests that the money received must be in the year of death. In parliamentary questions to Minister Martin van Rijn, disputed that the award must be done in the year prior to death. Not the amount itself in the prior year must be received."

Each year more than 300,000 volunteer complements are provided.

A carer of a care recipient with an intramural AWBZ indication who has not yet been admitted to an institution but was previously on a waiting list is not eligible for a care complement.

The Social Support Act 2015 provides that the national system will be replaced by new, local versions of the volunteer complement. Any reduction of the inheritance tax was thereby abolished.

Mantelzorg Penalty
The Dutch Senate had a bill pending that older people who move in with their children from July 2015 monthly 300 euro briefly on their state pension. State Secretary Jetta Klijnsma got no majority for its proposal in the Senate and decided on May 28, 2014, to postpone the penalty for a year.

References

Healthcare in the Netherlands